The 2010–11 Wake Forest Demon Deacons men's basketball team represented Wake Forest University in the 2010–11 NCAA Division I men's basketball season.  The team's head coach was Jeff Bzdelik, who was hired after the firing of Dino Gaudio. The team played its home games at Lawrence Joel Veterans Memorial Coliseum in Winston-Salem, North Carolina, and was a member of the Atlantic Coast Conference. They finished the season 8–24, 1–15 in ACC play and lost in the first round of the ACC tournament to Boston College.

Previous season
They finished the 2009–10 season 20–11, 9–7 in ACC play and lost in the first round of the 2010 ACC men's basketball tournament. They received an at–large bid to the 2010 NCAA Men's Division I Basketball Tournament, earning a 9 seed in the East Region. They defeated No. 8 seed Texas in overtime in the first round before losing to No. 1 seed and AP No. 2 Kentucky in the second round.

Recruiting
Wake Forest has a 5-man recruiting class for 2010.

Roster

Schedule

|-
!colspan=9 style=| Exhibition

|-
!colspan=9 style=| Regular season

|-
!colspan=9 style=| ACC tournament

Leaders by game

 Team Season Highs in Bold.

References

Wake Forest Demon Deacons men's basketball seasons
Wake Forest